Poly Varghese (born 20 November 1970) is a Hindustani musician and Mohan veena player, a disciple of  musician Vishwa Mohan Bhatt.  He is also an actor, poet and activist.

Personal life
Born in Kerala, Poly Varghese lives in Chennai.

Awards

 Radio One Award for young Hindustani instrumentalist - 2012
 Jeevan Atless Award - Best Music Director for Malayalam film Kootilekku (Towards Home) - 2005
 Gov’t recognition award for young Hindustani instrumentalists of India - 2013
 Concerts at Bangkok University Thailand on behalf of hr. Princess Maha Chakri Sirindhoran and
 honored with the title Sangeeth Bhushan on behalf of Hindustani art and music society

References

External links
Official site
Official Facebook

1970 births
Indian guitarists
Living people
Veena players
People from Thrissur district
Indian male classical musicians
Musicians from Kerala
21st-century guitarists
21st-century male musicians